Antonic or Antonić is a Slavic surname according to Slavic naming customs. Notable people with this name include the following:

Borislav Antonić (born 1964), Serbian politician
Dejan Antonić (born 1969), Serbian footballer
Goran Antonić (born 1990), Serbian footballer 
Jovica Antonić (born 1966), Serbian basketballer
Slobodan Antonić (born 1959), Serbian political scientist, sociologist and university professor
Stefan Antonić (born 2001), Indonesian footballer of partial Serbian descent
Vasilije Antonić (1860-1929), Serbian army officer, diplomat and politician
Voja Antonić (born 1952) Serbian inventor, journalist and writer

See also

Anton (given name)
Antoni
Antonia (name) 
Antonie (given name)
Antonie (surname)
Antonik
Antonin (name)
Antonio
Antonis 
Antoniu
Gary Antonick

Patronymic surnames
Croatian surnames
Serbian surnames
Surnames from given names